The Soul Man! is an album by American jazz pianist Bobby Timmons recorded in 1966 and released on the Prestige Records.

Reception
The Allmusic review by Ron Wynn awarded the album 3 stars stating: "Plenty of funk, blues, and soul-jazz, plus great piano."

Track listing
All compositions by Bobby Timmons except as noted
 "Cut Me Loose Charlie" - 5:40
 "Tom Thumb"  - 7:00
 "Ein Bahn Strasse (One Way Street)"  - 7:15
 "Damned If I Know" - 6:20
 "Tenaj"  - 7:00
 "Little Waltz"  - 7:09

Personnel
Bobby Timmons - piano
Wayne Shorter - tenor saxophone
Ron Carter - bass
Jimmy Cobb - drums

References

Prestige Records albums
Bobby Timmons albums
1966 albums
Albums recorded at Van Gelder Studio
Albums produced by Cal Lampley